The Toronto-Dominion Bank (TD Bank) is a financial services group based in Canada.

TD Bank may also refer to:
 TD Canada Trust, based in Toronto, Ontario, TD Bank's Canadian retail banking division
 TD Bank, N.A. based in Cherry Hill, New Jersey, TD Bank's American retail banking division
 Former U.S. retail-banking division TD Banknorth, since merged with Commerce Bancorp to form TD Bank, N.A.

Toronto-Dominion Bank